General Authority of Civil Aviation (GACA) is an organ of Saudi Arabia's Ministry of Transport and Logistic Services responsible for regulating the country's civil aviation sector. It was established in 1934 as the Civil Aviation Administration to oversee the air traffic control of Saudi Arabia. 

It is responsible for regulation of air transport services and the implementation of civil air regulations, air safety and airworthiness standards. It also co-ordinates all regulatory functions with International Civil Aviation Organization. The headquarters is in Riyadh.

The GACA emerged from the Presidency of Civil Aviation (PCA; مصلحة الطيران المدني) that was created when the institution controlling aviation was split into a civil department and the Royal Saudi Air Force. The Presidency of Civil Aviation was among others also in charge of the Saudi Arabian Airlines and the Meteorology Department. The Saudi Arabian Airlines was split from the Presidency of Civil Aviation in 1960 and became an independent public institution in 1963. The Meteorology Department became an independent institution with own budget in 1966. The name of the Presidency of Civil Aviation was changed to General Authority of Civil Aviation in 1977. In late December 2011 the GACA was separated from the ministry of defence and was attached directly to King Abdullah. Following this reorganization King Abdullah appointed Prince Fahd bin Abdullah bin Mohammed as the head of the GACA.

The former president of GACA was Nabeel Al Amoudi also was the minister of transport. Then Abdulhadi Al Mansouri was appointed as president. In 2021, Abdulaziz Al-Duailej was appointed head of the GACA.

The GACA operates four international and 23 domestic airports within Saudi Arabia. GACA introduced a number of e-services in 2019. These included check-in, baggage drop and self-scanning devices.

In March 2021, GACA launched an electronic portal that offers the passengers, among different services, the option to know information about their trip by communicating with a digital assistant.

See also

 Rabigh Wings Aviation Academy
 Saudi Aviation Club

References

External links
  GACA website

1963 establishments in Saudi Arabia
Government agencies established in 1963
Airport operators
Saudi Arabia
Civil aviation in Saudi Arabia
Air navigation service providers
Government agencies of Saudi Arabia
Transport organisations based in Saudi Arabia